Antony Hamilton Holles (17 January 1901, Fulham, London-  4 March 1950, Marylebone, London) was a British stage and film actor. Educated at Latymer School, Holles was on stage from 1916 in Charley's Aunt. He was the son of the actor William Holles (1867-1947) and his wife Nannie Goldman.

His West End roles included appearances in Sorry You've Been Troubled (1929), Good Losers, (1931), Take a Chance (1931), Libel! (1934), The Composite Man (1936) and Tony Draws a Horse (1939).

Selected filmography

 The Will (1921) - Charles Ross
 The Missing Rembrandt (1932) - Marquess de Chaminade
 Once Bitten (1932) - Legros
 Life Goes On (1932) - John Collis
 The Star Reporter (1932, Short) - Bonzo
 The Mayor's Nest (1932) - Saxophonist in Paradise Row Band (uncredited)
 Hotel Splendide (1932) - 'Mrs.LeGrange'
 The Lodger (1932) - Silvono
 Watch Beverly (1932) - Arthur Briden
 Reunion (1932) - Padre
 The Midshipmaid (1932) - Lt. Kingsford
 She Was Only a Village Maiden (1933) - Vicar
 Forging Ahead (1933) - Percival Custard
 Cash (1933) - Inspector
 Loyalties (1933) - Ricardos
 Britannia of Billingsgate (1933) - Guidobaldi
 That's a Good Girl (1933) - Canzone
 Borrowed Clothes (1934) - Gilbert Pinkley
 Something Always Happens (1934) - Tony (uncredited)
 Nell Gwynn (1934) - Actor At Drury Lane (uncredited)
 The Green Pack (1934) - Inspector Aguilar
 Road House (1934) - Receptionist at Hotel Splendide (uncredited)
 Brewster's Millions (1935) - Ferago, the Mayor
 Drake the Pirate (1935) - English Spy (uncredited)
 Look Up and Laugh (1935) - Store Manager (uncredited)
 The Phantom Light (1935) - Mr. Mason (uncredited)
 Gentlemen's Agreement (1935) - Bill Bentley
 Things to Come (1936) - Simon Burton (uncredited)
 Public Nuisance No. 1 (1936) - Head Waiter
 It's Love Again (1936) - Headwaiter (uncredited)
 Seven Sinners (1936) - Reception Clerk
 The Gay Adventure (1936) - Charles
 The Tenth Man (1936) - Swalescliffe
 This'll Make You Whistle (1936) - Sebastian Venables
 Talk of the Devil (1936) - Colquhoun
 Sensation (1936) - Clake
 Conquest of the Air (1936) - Paul Bleylich-Lilienthal's mechanic (uncredited)
 Action for Slander (1937) - John Grant
 Dark Journey (1937) - Dutchman
 Glamorous Night (1937) - Maestro
 Big Fella (1937) - Gendarme (uncredited)
 Limelight (1937) - Impresario
 Let's Make a Night of It (1937) - Head Waiter
 Smash and Grab (1937) - Polino
 Under Secret Orders (1937) - Mario
 Paradise for Two (1937) - Brand
 Millions (1937) - Billy Todd
 Romance à la carte (1938) - Rudolph
 His Lordship Regrets (1938) - Guy Reading
 Dangerous Medicine (1938) - Alistair Hoard
 Weddings Are Wonderful (1938) - Adolph
 They Drive by Night (1938) - Murray
 The Sky's the Limit (1938) - Marillo
 Miracles Do Happen (1938) - Proctor
 Black Limelight (1939) - Urcher (uncredited)
 Over the Moon (1939) - Gondolier (uncredited)
 Black Eyes (1939) - Reprimanded Waiter (uncredited)
 The Missing People (1940) - Ernest Bronstone
 Down Our Alley (1939) - Tony
 Blind Folly (1939) - Louis
 The Spider (1940) - Bath's manager
 Ten Days in Paris (1940) - Francois
 Neutral Port (1940) - Chief of Police
 Front Line Kids (1942) - Hotelier
 Uncensored (1942) - (uncredited)
 Lady from Lisbon (1942) - Tony Anzoni
 Talk About Jacqueline (1942) - Attendant
 Tomorrow We Live (1943) - Stationmaster
 Thursday's Child (1943) - Roy Todd
 Warn That Man (1943) - Waiter
 Schweik's New Adventures (1943) - Opera manager
 They Met in the Dark (1943) - Hotel Hairdresser
 Up with the Lark (1943) - Martel
 Old Mother Riley Overseas (1943)
 Battle for Music (1943)
 It's in the Bag (1944) - Costumier
 A Canterbury Tale (1944) - Sergt. Bassett
 English Without Tears (1944) - (uncredited)
 Give Me the Stars (1945) - Achille Lebrun
 Caesar and Cleopatra (1945) - Boatman
 They Knew Mr. Knight (1946) - Station Master
 Gaiety George (1946) - Wade
 The Magic Bow (1946) - Manager
 Carnival (1946) - Corentin
 Fortune Lane (1947) - Mr. Carpenter
 The Dark Road (1948)
 Bonnie Prince Charlie (1948) - Col. Warren (uncredited)
 The Rocking Horse Winner (1949) - Bowler Hat (uncredited)
 Traveller's Joy (1949) - Head Waiter (final film role)

References

External links

1901 births
1950 deaths
English male stage actors
English male film actors
20th-century English male actors
Male actors from London